The Netherlands women's junior national handball team is the national under-19 handball team of the Netherlands. Controlled by the Netherlands Handball Association it represents the Netherlands in international matches.

History

World Championship
 Champions   Runners up   Third place   Fourth place

European Championship
 Champions   Runners up   Third place   Fourth place

References

External links

Women's handball in the Netherlands
Women's national junior handball teams
Handball